The Nudist Story is a 1960 British film set at a nudist colony. It was released in the U.S. as Pussycat's Paradise, and is also known as For Members Only.

Plot
Prudish businesswoman Jane Robinson inherits the 'Avonmore Sun Camp' from her eccentric grandfather and decides to sell it so she can pay taxes on the relative's estate. However, some of the members ask her to take a look at the club first. While touring the grounds, she starts to fall in love with the place and also with one of its handsome patrons. Jane soon finds herself embroiled in a hazardous love triangle. A couple of song and dance scenes, the reasonable script and the relatively high production values has ensured the film's reputation as one of the pre-eminent nudist films.

Cast Member Note
Brian Cobby from 1985 was the Voice of the UK's 'Speaking Clock' service, reached by dialing 123.

Cast
Shelley Martin as Jane Robinson
Brian Cobby as Bob Sutton
Natalie Lynn as Aunt Meg
Anthony Oliver as Stephen Blake
Joy Hinton as Carol Sutton
Jacqueline D'orsay as Gloria Phillips
Paul Kendrick as Tim Sutton

Critical reception
The Manchester Guardian wrote, "It's the Citizen Kane of nudist films."

References

External links
ly-Martin/dp/B00GM3A1N0 The Nudist Story]'' on Amazon.com

1960 films
British drama films
1960 drama films
Films shot at New Elstree Studios
1960s English-language films
1960s British films